Berkeley Mall is a shopping center in Goldsboro, North Carolina. It is owned by Faison Enterprises  which is headquartered in Charlotte, North Carolina. The Mall has over 40 stores including several outparcel buildings outside the mall complete with several dining options. The main anchors are Belk and JCPenney. The Mall is located at 625 N. Berkeley Blvd right off US 70.

History
Berkeley Mall opened in 1975.
One of the original anchors was Weil's, which became Brody's, which was sold to Proffitt's in 1998, and again to Belk in 2006. Jo-Ann Fabrics opened at the mall in 2013.

Berkeley Mall suffered roof damage near the Belk store on August 27, 2011, as a result of Hurricane Irene moving through eastern North Carolina.

On October 15, 2018, it was announced that Sears would be closing as part of a plan to close 142 stores nationwide.

References

Shopping malls in North Carolina
Shopping malls established in 1975